The Simca 1100 is a car built from 1967 to 1982 by Simca. It was replaced by the Simca-Talbot Horizon.

History
The 1100 was the result of "Project 928", started in 1962, finalized by engineers Philippe Grundeler and Charles Scales. The design was a result of Simca's market research in the early 1960s, which showed the increasing popularity of front wheel drive cars that provided better utilization of space and comfort in small cars. In Spring 1962, Simca organized a 1966–67 launch of a new range of front wheel drive cars with saloons, estates cars and light commercial vehicles to be included, all fitting into France's 6CV tax class – between the Simca Mille and Simca 1300. Both transverse and longitudinal engine placement were tested, and in 1963 the transverse-engine design was approved. The Simca 1100 was one of the first designs outside Fiat to feature a transverse engine with an end-on gearbox and unequal length driveshafts (now near-universal amongst small cars), a possible result of Fiat influence as a major shareholder.

In 1963, Chrysler took a controlling interest in Simca, approving the project in 1964, with a production target of summer 1967. The short timetable included developing a new transmission, and using a larger version of the rear engined rear wheel drive Simca Mille (Simca 1000) "Poissy engine", displacing 1118 cc (the Mille used a 1.0 litre engine, the 1500 a 1.5 litre engine).

Introduction

When first shown on Sardinia and at the Paris Auto Show in 1967, the 1100 was advanced in design, featuring a hatchback with folding rear seats, disc brakes, rack and pinion steering, an independent front (double wishbone) and rear (trailing arm) suspension using torsion bars. Numerous permutations were available, with a manual, automatic and semi-automatic transmission. The engine was slanted to allow for a lower bonnet; and the engine, gearbox, and suspension were carried on a subframe to allow the unibody to be relatively unstressed. The body was welded to the frame, not bolted. The 1100 was reportedly studied closely by Volkswagen when the latter company was designing its Volkswagen Golf, after making rear-engined, rear-wheel-drive vehicles.

Models
The 1100 was one of the first hatchback designs to enter production, with a folding rear seat and in three and five-door variations. It was similar in concept to another French car, the Renault 16, which had been launched two years before.

Different equipment levels were defined as LS, GL, GLS and "Special" tags. Three- and five-door estate cars were also included in the range.

The car was fitted with Simca Type 315 petrol OHV "Poissy engines" with 944, 1118, and 1294 cc variants, depending on year and market. A "stroked" 1118 cc engine displacing 1.2 litres was introduced in 1971 to the UK market as the Simca 1204. It was also sold in the US in limited quantities. In 1974, the sporty TI appeared with the 1294 cc engine (82 PS), at the time when the car also saw a cosmetic redesign. Based on the 1100 chassis, the Matra engineering firm created a crossover derivation named Matra Rancho.

The 1100 had a four-speed manual gearbox and room for five people. There was also a three-speed semi-automatic gearbox that required manual shifting but used an electronically activated clutch.  The 1100s transmission configuration was the same as the one introduced by Fiat on the 1964 Autobianchi Primula, in that it was transverse and axial with the engine giving the "engine on one side, transmission on the other" layout copied on almost all "hatchbacks" and front wheel drive vehicles throughout the world ever since. In France, the 1100 was very successful, achieving best-seller status, but it was less competitive in non-European export markets.

The First "Hot Hatch".

Perhaps the car with the strongest claim to be the first "Hot Hatch" was the Simca 1100 Ti which was available on sale in 1974 with 82 hp (up over 40% from 58 hp of the standard models) which dramatically improved performance and sent the top speed over 100 mph for the first time to 105 mph and a 0-60 mph time of 12 seconds. Based on the 1100 Special introduced in 1970, distinguishing features of this performance version were its six-headlamp and foglight arrangement, front disc brakes, front and rear spoilers, alloy wheels, matte black grille and single colour paint scheme (red), items which would be adopted by the many Hot Hatches that would follow. Based on the Simca 1100 range introduced in 1967, the front wheel drive hatchback was a top seller throughout Europe and said to have inspired VW to replace its rear-engined range with a new front-engine product range including the Polo and Golf. Another early hot hatch was the Renault 5 Alpine (called Gordini in the UK due to Chrysler owning the Alpine model name there) which first went on sale in May 1976 and also pre-dated sales of the Volkswagen Golf GTi, by two months. The 1100Ti was never sold in RHD in the UK.

Three LCV versions with van, pick up and High Top Van bodystyles were also available. In France and most European markets these were sold as the "Simca 1100 Fourgonnette". In the UK the high-roof van was called the Simca VF2 (short for "Voiture Fourgonnette"), and was sold from December 1972. The regular low-roof van was called the VF1, while an even higher roofed version introduced for 1978 became the VF3. The pick-up model arrived in December 1975. Commercial versions lasted until the spring of 1985, three years after the 1100 passenger car models had been removed from the market. In the United Kingdom, commercial models assumed the Dodge nameplate after 1976 and were called Talbots after 1979. The commercial models were sold as 'Simca Fixaren' ("the fixer") in Sweden, where they were fitted with a  version of the 1.3 litre engine.

In addition to the dedicated van models, there was also a two-seater commercial version of the three-door hatchback available to French customers from December 1976. This, the  1100 AS (for Affaires et Societés, businesses and companies) qualified for a considerably lower tax rate.

The 1100 was introduced in the U.S. in 1969 as the Simca 1204 because it had a larger 1204 cc engine that produced 62 horsepower. Both the hatchback and station wagon models were offered. The car was not successful in America, and Simca left the U.S. market in 1972.

Commercial
During the first full year of production 1968, volumes were already strong with 138,242 vehicles made.   Importantly, incremental sales appeared to come mostly from competitor manufacturers, since overall Simca production surged from 251,056 cars in 1967 to 350,083 in 1968, and volumes for the slightly smaller Simca 1000 were virtually identical in each of these two years.

Production peaked in 1973, with nearly 300,000 Simca 1100s rolling off the assembly line. However, production fell rapidly through 1977, when over 142,000 1100s were made, and in 1978 (with the Chrysler Horizon launched in February 1978), just half that number (72,695) of Simca 1100s was made.  Volumes dwindled to below 20,000 in 1981 which was the last year of production in France, though in Spain production continued through to 1982 of the car and 1985 for the van version.

Production
The Simca 1100 was produced in different places; in Sweden, local production was handled by Phillipsons, on the same assembly lines that made Mercedes-Benz cars, and also in Madrid (Spain) at the former Barreiros Diesel factory. Spanish-built 1100s were marketed as the Simca 1200 and the TI version had an  1442 cc engine.

A total of 2.2 million cars were produced. The replacement for the 1100, the C2 project, was unveiled at the end of 1977 as the Chrysler Horizon - Chrysler's "world car" - and was an enormous success in the United States, where it sold as the Dodge Omni and Plymouth Horizon. In Europe it was briefly sold as the Chrysler Horizon in the UK and the Simca Horizon in the rest of Europe, before being rebranded as a Talbot following Peugeot's takeover of Chrysler Europe. The 1100 remained in production alongside it in France until 1982 and elsewhere until 1985, also under the Talbot brand.

The 1100 was also the basis for the Matra Rancho, an early crossover which had a genuine offroad appearance but was built on the front-wheel drive Simca 1100 basis.

Range
944 cc - 45 PS (33 kW)
1118 cc - 50/52/60 PS (37/38/44 kW)
1204 cc - 59 PS (43 kW)
1294 cc - 62/75 PS (46/55 kW)
1442 cc - 83 PS (61 kW) (Spanish market "Simca 1200" only)

See also
Hot hatch

References

External links

 
 
 

1100
Front-wheel-drive vehicles
Slanted engines
Hatchbacks
Sedans
Cars introduced in 1967
1970s cars
1980s cars